Josef Steinmayer (born 27 January 1947) is a Swiss sailor. He competed in the Star event at the 1984 Summer Olympics.

References

External links
 

1947 births
Living people
Swiss male sailors (sport)
Olympic sailors of Switzerland
Sailors at the 1984 Summer Olympics – Star
Place of birth missing (living people)